Tim Rogge (born 3 February 1977, in Oudenaarde) is a Belgian retired middle-distance runner who specialised in the 800 metres. He represented his country at the 1997 World Championships without advancing from the first round.

International competitions

Personal bests
Outdoor
400 metres – 49.23 (Oordegem 2005)
800 metres – 1:46.07 (Hechtel 1997)
1000 metres – 2:22.56 (Heverlee 2001)
1500 metres – 3:51.30 (Oordegem 2006)
Indoor
800 metres – 1:48.03 (Ghent 1998)
1500 metres – 4:01.74 (Ghent 2008)

References

All-Athletics profile

1977 births
Living people
Belgian male middle-distance runners
World Athletics Championships athletes for Belgium
People from Oudenaarde
Sportspeople from East Flanders